Vânia Yukie Ishii (バニア・ユキエ・イシイ, born August 19, 1973, in São Paulo) is a female judoka from Brazil, daughter of Chiaki Ishii who won the bronze medal at the 1972 Summer Olympics in Munich.

Vânia Yukie Ishii won the gold medal in the half middleweight division (– 63 kg) at the 1999 Pan American Games. She represented her native country at two consecutive Summer Olympics, starting in 2000 in Sydney, Australia.

References

External links
 
  Profile
 Vânia Ishii - JudoInside.com

1973 births
Living people
Judoka at the 2000 Summer Olympics
Judoka at the 2004 Summer Olympics
Judoka at the 1999 Pan American Games
Judoka at the 2003 Pan American Games
Olympic judoka of Brazil
Brazilian people of Japanese descent
Sportspeople from São Paulo
Brazilian female judoka
Pan American Games gold medalists for Brazil
Pan American Games silver medalists for Brazil
Pan American Games medalists in judo
Goodwill Games medalists in judo
Competitors at the 1990 Goodwill Games
Medalists at the 1999 Pan American Games
Medalists at the 2003 Pan American Games